Fasanerieallee is an alley in Tiergarten in Berlin, Germany. It is primarily known for the many sculptures from the Wilhelmine period. Fasanerieallee is connected to Großer Stern.

Sculpture

External links 
 

Streets in Berlin
Tiergarten (park)